USAF usually refers to the United States Air Force, the aerial warfare branch of the U.S. Armed Forces.

USAF may also refer to:
 United States Armed Forces itself, the military of the United States of America
 United Student Aid Funds, a nonprofit corporation that works to enhance postsecondary-education preparedness, access and success
 Upper Saint Anthony Falls, part of the Saint Anthony Falls
 Jane's USAF, a 1999 video game
 A common typo for UASF or "User Activated Soft Fork", a technique for updating Bitcoin and other blockchains

See also
 USSF (disambiguation)